The de Burgo Baronetcy, of Castle Connell in the County of Limerick, was a title in the Baronetage of Ireland created on 16 June 1785 for Richard de Burgo. The first Baronet was born Richard Burke, but later assumed the surname of de Burgo (the Latin spelling of the family surname). The title became extinct on the death of the fourth Baronet in 1873. The de Burgo family were believed to be a branch of the Burke (or de Burgh) family headed by the Earl of Clanricarde.

de Burgo baronets, of Castle Conel (1785)
Sir Richard de Burgo, 1st Baronet (died 1790) 
Sir Richard de Burgo, 2nd Baronet (–c. 1808)
Sir John Allan de Burgo, 3rd Baronet (died 1839)
Sir Richard Donellan de Burgo, 4th Baronet (1821–1873)

References

Further reading

Burke, John. A General and Heraldic Dictionary of the Peerage and Baronetage of the British Empire. Volume I.

Extinct baronetcies in the Baronetage of Ireland